Barnala Assembly constituency (Sl. No.: 103) is a Punjab Legislative Assembly constituency in Barnala district, Punjab state, India.

Members of the Legislative Assembly

Election results

2022

2017

Previous Results

See also
 List of constituencies of the Punjab Legislative Assembly
 Barnala district

References

External links
 

Assembly constituencies of Punjab, India
Barnala district